{{Album ratings
| rev1      = AllMusic
| rev1Score = 
| rev2 = ‘’The Encyclopedia of Popular Music| rev2Score = 
}}The Ultimate Collection is a compilation of singles by British rock band the Kinks. It was released on Sanctuary Records on 27 May 2002 in the UK and 23 September 2003 in the United States. In August 2002, it reached no. 48 in the UK top 100 albums chart, and no. 1 in the UK Indie albums chart. It has been certified platinum by the British Phonographic Industry.

The first disc contains every charting British single from 1964 to 1983 in chronological order, with the exception of the group's first two singles. Of the 24 tracks, 14 were top ten hits in the UK. The second disc contains songs that either were released as B-sides or singles that did not chart in the UK and/or charted as singles in the North American and European markets, with the following exceptions: "Stop Your Sobbing" from the band's debut album and covered in 1979 as the debut single by The Pretenders; "Celluloid Heroes", taken from the album Everybody's in Show-Biz and released as a single three months later, failing to chart; and "Living on a Thin Line" from the album Word of Mouth''.

The singles "Death of a Clown" and "Susannah's Still Alive" were credited to Dave Davies rather than the Kinks. The band plays on those records, however.

Track listing

Disc one

Disc two

All releases United Kingdom except *United States **Sweden/Norway

Charts

References

2002 greatest hits albums
The Kinks compilation albums
Sanctuary Records compilation albums
Universal Music Group compilation albums